The 2019 Wofford Terriers football team represents Wofford College in the 2019 NCAA Division I FCS football season. They are led by second-year head coach Josh Conklin and play their home games at Gibbs Stadium. They are a member of the Southern Conference (SoCon).

Previous season

The Terriers finished the 2018 season 9–4, 6–2 in SoCon play to finish in a tie for the SoCon championship alongside East Tennessee State and Furman. They received the automatic bid to the FCS Playoffs, where they defeated Elon in the first round before losing in the second round to Kennesaw State.

Preseason

Preseason polls
The SoCon released their preseason media poll and coaches poll on July 22, 2019. The Terriers were picked to finish in first place in both polls.

Preseason All-SoCon Teams
The Terriers placed nine players on the preseason all-SoCon teams.

Offense

1st team

Justus Basinger – OL

Michael Ralph – OL

2nd team

Blake Jeresaty – OL

Defense

1st team

Thad Mangum – DL

2nd team

Mikel Horton – DL

Jireh Wilson – LB

Mason Alstatt – DB

George Gbesee – DB

Specialists

2nd team

Luke Carter – P

Schedule

Game summaries

at South Carolina State

Samford

Gardner–Webb

at VMI

at East Tennessee State

Western Carolina

Chattanooga

at Clemson

at Mercer

Furman

at The Citadel

FCS Playoffs
The Terriers received an automatic bid (due to winning their conference) for the postseason tournament, with a first-round pairing against Kennesaw State.

Kennesaw State–First Round

Rankings

References

Wofford
Wofford Terriers football seasons
Southern Conference football champion seasons
Wofford
Wofford Terriers football